The men's high jump at the 2006 European Athletics Championships were held at the Ullevi on August 7 and August 9.

Medalists

Schedule

Results

Qualification
Qualification: Qualifying Performance 2.28 (Q) or at least 12 best performers (q) advance to the final.

Final

References
Results

High jump
High jump at the European Athletics Championships